Barwala Taluka (Barvala Taluka) is a taluka of Botad District, India. Barvala is a headquarter of the Taluka.

Prior to August 2013 it was part of Ahmedabad District.

Notes and references

Talukas of Gujarat
Botad district